3-Chloromethcathinone (also known as 3-CMC and clophedrone) is a stimulant drug of the cathinone class that has been sold online as a designer drug, mainly in European countries such as Ireland, Italy, Poland and Sweden.

The pharmacology of 3-CMC is unknown, though it is probably a dopamine and serotonin releasing agent. Its chemical structure bears some resemblance to bupropion, but more closely resembles para-Chloromethamphetamine which is neurotoxic. Studies in mice indicate 3-CMC is neurotoxic

Legality 

As of October 2015 3-CMC is a controlled substance in China. As of April 2019 it is classified as a dangerous and prohibited drug in Sweden.

See also
 3-Fluoromethcathinone
 3-Fluoromethamphetamine
 3-Methylmethcathinone
 3-Chloromethamphetamine
 4-Chloromethcathinone
 5-Cl-bk-MPA
 Substituted cathinone

References 

Cathinones
Designer drugs
Chlorobenzenes
Serotonin-norepinephrine-dopamine releasing agents